The Disney family is an American family that gained prominence when brothers Roy and Walt began creating films through the Disney Brothers Cartoon Studio, today known as mass media and entertainment conglomerate The Walt Disney Company. The Disney family's influence on American culture grew with successful feature films such as Snow White and the Seven Dwarfs in 1937 and the opening of the Disneyland theme park in 1955. Other Disney family members have been involved in the management and administration of the Disney company, filmmaking, and philanthropy.

Background
The family name, originally d'Isigny ("from Isigny"), is of Norman French derivation, coming from the town of Isigny-sur-Mer. The Disneys, among others, descended from Normans who colonised Ireland around the 11th century.

Elias Disney
Elias Charles Disney (1859–1941)  was born in the rural village of Bluevale, in what is now Ontario, Canada, to Irish Protestant immigrants Kepple Elias Disney (1832–1891) and Mary Richardson (1838–1909). Both parents had emigrated from Ireland to Canada as children, accompanying their parents.

Disney married Flora Call (1868–1938) on January 1, 1888, in Kismet, Lake County, Florida. The couple had five children:
Herbert Arthur Disney (December 8, 1888 – January 29, 1961, aged 72)
Raymond Arnold Disney (December 30, 1890 – May 24, 1989, aged 98)
Roy Oliver Disney (June 24, 1893 – December 20, 1971, aged 78)
Walter "Walt" Elias Disney (December 5, 1901 – December 15, 1966, aged 65)
Ruth Flora Disney (December 6, 1903 – April 7, 1995, aged 91)

Roy O. Disney family
Roy Oliver Disney (June 24, 1893 – December 20, 1971) was an American businessman and co-founder of The Walt Disney Company. Roy was married to Edna Francis from April 1925 until his death. Roy's nephew Charles Elias Disney chose to name his son Charles Roy Disney in Roy's honor.

Their son, Roy Edward Disney (January 10, 1930 – December 17, 2009), was a longtime senior executive for the Walt Disney Company and the last member of the Disney family to be actively involved in the company. Disney was often compared to his uncle and father. He had two sons (one, Tim Disney, a documentary film producer), and two daughters; his daughter Abigail Disney is a documentary filmmaker.

Walt Disney family
Walter "Walt" Elias Disney (December 5, 1901 – December 15, 1966) was an American entrepreneur, animator, writer, voice actor and film producer who cofounded Disney Brothers Studio with his brother Roy. He received 59 Academy Award nominations, including 22 awards: both totals are records.

He married Lillian Bounds in 1925. Their marriage produced two daughters, Diane (December 18, 1933 – November 19, 2013) and Sharon (adopted in December 1936, born six weeks previously – February 16, 1993).

Diane married Ronald William Miller, who became president of Walt Disney Productions in 1980 and CEO in 1983, before being ousted by Roy E. Disney.

Legacy
In 2009, the Walt Disney Family Museum, designed by Disney's daughter Diane and her son (Walt's grandson) Walter E. D. Miller, opened in the Presidio of San Francisco. The museum was established to promote and inspire creativity and innovation and celebrate and study the life of Walt Disney.

References

External links
 The Walt Disney Family Museum: Walt's Biography with pictures
 The Walt Disney Family Museum: The Disney Family Photo Album
 The Walt Disney Family Museum: Walt's Children
 Disney Diane Disney: Walt Disney Family Museum History
A family feud over a $400 million trust fund, a massive fortune that left one heiress with an inferiority complex, and a sprawling media empire. Meet the Disney family.

Disney family
American families of English ancestry
American families of Irish ancestry
American families of French ancestry
American families of German ancestry